Forrest Noah Lamp (born February 20, 1994) is an American football guard who is a free agent. He played college football at Western Kentucky and was drafted by the Los Angeles Chargers in the second round of the 2017 NFL Draft.

Early years
Lamp attended Venice High School in Venice, Florida. He played both offensive and defensive line. He committed to Western Kentucky University to play college football.

College career
Lamp redshirted his first year at Western Kentucky in 2012. He opened the season as the starter at right guard, before shifting to left tackle for the final nine games. Lamp remained the starting left tackle throughout his college career, starting 51 games total in his career.

Professional career
Lamp received an invitation to the Senior Bowl and had his stock quickly rise after a solid week of practice. He injured his ankle and was unable to play in the game. Although he played offensive tackle throughout his collegiate career, many teams speculated a switch to guard in the NFL due to his lack of arm length. He also attended the NFL Combine and completed all of the combine drills. 

At Western Kentucky's Pro Day, Lamp opted to only run positional drills and stood on his combine performance. NFL draft experts and analysts projected Lamp to be selected in the first round. He was ranked the top guard in the draft by NFLDraftScout.com and Pro Football Focus, the top offensive lineman by ESPN, the top interior offensive lineman by NFL media analysts Mike Mayock and Bucky Brooks, and the third best offensive tackle by Sports Illustrated.

Los Angeles Chargers
The Los Angeles Chargers selected Lamp in the second round (38th overall) of the 2017 NFL Draft. Lamp was the first offensive guard drafted in 2017. 

On May 11, the Los Angeles Chargers signed Lamp to a four-year, $6.66 million contract with $3.75 million guaranteed and a signing bonus of $2.98 million. On August 2, 2017, Lamp suffered a torn ACL during training camp, and was ruled out for his entire rookie season. He was officially placed on injured reserve on September 2, 2017.

On May 15, 2018, Lamp underwent a minor knee procedure, described as a routine cleanup. He entered 2018 as a backup guard to starters Dan Feeney and Michael Schofield. He only played in two games, and was a healthy scratch for much of the season.

In 2019, Lamp played in seven games with two starts before suffering a broken fibula. He was placed on injured reserve on October 23, 2019.

Lamp started all 16 games at left guard for the Chargers in 2020, leading the league with 1,174 total snaps.

Buffalo Bills
Lamp signed with the Buffalo Bills on April 15, 2021. He was placed on injured reserve on August 23, 2021, and released two days later.

New Orleans Saints
On October 19, 2021, Lamp was signed to the New Orleans Saints practice squad. He re-signed with the Saints on April 1, 2022. He was placed on injured reserve on August 19, 2022. He was released on October 25.

References

External links

Western Kentucky Hilltoppers bio

1994 births
Living people
People from Venice, Florida
Players of American football from Florida
American football offensive tackles
American football offensive guards
Western Kentucky Hilltoppers football players
Los Angeles Chargers players
Buffalo Bills players
New Orleans Saints players
Ed Block Courage Award recipients